Joosia macrocalyx is a species of plant in the family Rubiaceae. It is endemic to Ecuador.

References

macrocalyx
Flora of Ecuador
Vulnerable plants
Taxonomy articles created by Polbot